Kayin State, also known by the endonyms Kawthoolei and Karen State, is a state of Myanmar. The capital city is Hpa-An, also spelled Pa-An.

The relief of Karen State is mountainous with the Dawna Range running along the state in a NNW - SSE direction and the southern end of the Karen Hills in the northwest. It is bordered by Mae Hong Son, Tak, and Kanchanaburi provinces of Thailand to the east; Mon State and Bago Region to the west and south; Mandalay Region, Shan State and Kayah State to the north.

History
The region that forms today's Karen State was part of successive Burmese kingdoms since the formation of the Bagan Empire in mid-11th century. During the 13th to 16th centuries, much of the region belonged to the Hanthawaddy Kingdom, while the northern part of the region belonged to Taungoo, a vassal state of Ava Kingdom. The region became part of Taungoo Dynasty and Konbaung Dynasty from 16th to 19th centuries. The British seized the southern third of today's Karen State (below the Salween River) after the First Anglo-Burmese War (1824-1826), and the rest after the Second Anglo-Burmese War of 1852.

Towards the end of the British colonial era (1945-1948), the Karen leadership insisted on a separate state covering today's Karen State and much of Mon State and Taninthayi Region, within the British Empire. They refused to sign the Panglong Agreement of February 1947, which was the basis for the 1947 Constitution of Burma, and boycotted the pre-independence elections of April 1947. Nonetheless, the constitution granted the Karen a state, though with an area less than what the Karen leadership had asked for from the British. The constitution also guaranteed states with the right to secede from the Union after a period of 10 years. (The Panglong Agreement gave only the Shan and the Kachin a state each; the Chin who actually signed the agreement did not receive a state.) The Karen National Union (KNU), which dominated the Karen leadership, was not satisfied, and wanted outright independence. In 1949, the KNU raised a rebellion that continues up to today. The KNU celebrates January 31 as 'revolution day', marking the day they went underground at the battle of Insein.

Much of the state has been a battlefield since then. The civilians have taken the brunt of the war. The KNU today forms the world's longest-running resistance. The military government purportedly changed the English name of the state to Kayin State from Karen State in 1989.

Since 1976 the KNU has called for a federal system rather than an independent Karen State. In January 2012, Myanmar's military-backed civilian government signed a ceasefire deal with the KNU in Hpa-an, the capital of eastern Kayin State. Aung Min, the Railway Minister, and General Mutu Sae Poe of the KNU led the peace talks.

Geography
Located between latitudes 15° 45' north and 19° 25' north and longitudes 96° 10' east and 98° 28' east. It has a hot and humid climate because of the mountain ranges that lie in its backdrop and its location, which is near the sea, in the tropics. The temperature of the hottest month in eastern mountain regions never falls below . Lowlands in the west and south of the state are located in the tropical monsoon climate. The regions get most of the rain in summer. Some of the rivers and creeks in Karen State are flowing from south to north due to the location of the mountains. The main rivers in the state are Thanlwin (Salween River), Thaungyin (Moei River), Gyaing and Attaran.

Government
The government of Kayin State is split into three branches: an executive (Kayin State Government), a legislative (Kayin State Hluttaw), and a judicial (Kayin State High Court).

Administrative divisions
Karen State consists of one city and nine towns. It has four districts, seven townships and 4092 villages.

Districts
Hpa-an District
Myawaddy District
Kawkareik District
Hpapun District
Kyondoe District

Townships
Hpa-an Township
Hlaingbwe Township
Hpapun Township
Thandaunggyi Township
Myawaddy Township
Kawkareik Township
Kyainseikgyi Township

Cities and towns

Villages and hamlets

Due to the mountainous terrain in Karen State, most villages are small and contain less than 40 households so a large amount of Karen's population is dotted across the countryside over hundreds, if not thousands of villages.

Demographics

Population

Since the 1973 Census, the population of Karen State has increased from 858,429 to 1,055,359 in the 1983 census and 1,574,079 in the census of 2014.  This means the population of Karen State has increased by about 49 percent between the 1983 and the 2014 census. The population of Karen State ranks eleventh in size when compared with other States and Regions in the country, only higher than Tanintharyi Region, Nay Pyi Taw Union Territory and Chin State. In terms of the proportion of the total population, the population of Karen State has marginally increased from 3.0 percent in 1983 to 3.1 percent in 2014.

Religion
According to the 2014 Myanmar Census, Buddhists, who make up 84.5% of Kayin State's population, form the largest religious community there. Minority religious communities include Christians (9.5%), Muslims (4.6%), Hindus (0.6%), and animists (0.1%) who collectively comprise the remainder of Kayin State's population. 0.7% of the population listed no religion, other religions, or were otherwise not enumerated.

According to the State Sangha Maha Nayaka Committee’s 2016 statistics, 14,080 Buddhist monks were registered in Kayin State, comprising 2.6% of Myanmar's total Sangha membership, which includes both novice samanera and fully-ordained bhikkhu. The majority of monks belong to the Thudhamma Nikaya (89%), followed by Shwegyin Nikaya (9.7%), with the remainder of monks belonging to other small monastic orders. 1,000 thilashin were registered in Kayin State, comprising 1.7% of Myanmar's total thilashin community.

Economy

Tourism
Tourism is one of the main economy of Karen State. After the signing of the preliminary ceasefire between the KNU and the Myanmar government in 2012, the number of visitors to Karen State increased largely. Karen State experienced over 40,000 tourists in 2013, followed by 50,000 in 2014. In 2016, the number of visitors reached a record 150,000.

Border Trade
Myawaddy border trading post of Karen State is the second biggest among Myanmar's 15 border trading posts. It is the main border crossing trade route between Thailand and Myanmar. According to Thailand's Chamber of Commerce, the monthly trade between the two countries in 2015 through the Mae Sot to Myawaddy crossing was worth over 3 billion baht (about 90 million US dollar).

Agriculture
Karen State is a farming state. Currently, there are over 460,000 acres of paddy fields and 260,000 acres of rubber tree plantations in Karen State. There is over 9000 acres of coffee land in Thandaung area.  The Kayin State government is trying to implement new farming technology to improve its agriculture sector.

Industry
In 2016, the government announced a strategy to attract domestic and foreign investors to the Hpa-An industrial zone. However, shortage of electricity supply hinders the development of Hpa-An industrial zone. The Kayin State government in conjunction with a Japanese company has been trying to carry out a feasibility survey for an 1800-megawatt coal-fired power plant to fulfill the need of electricity supply. On the other hand, community members and local environmental groups have raised concerns about the potential impacts from coal plant emissions.

Transport
Karen State is served by Hpapun Airport and Hpa-An Airport but none of those currently use for public transportation.

In 2015, the Asian Development Bank (ADB) approved a $100 million loan to improve a 66.4 kilometer section of road connecting the towns of Eindu and Kawkareik in Kayin state, the missing link of the Greater Mekong Subregion (GMS) East-West Corridor.

Education

Major universities in Kayin state include Hpa-An University, Computer University, Hpa-An and Technological University, Hpa-An.

Educational opportunities in Myanmar are limited outside the main cities of Yangon and Mandalay. It is especially a problem in Karen State where constant fighting between the government and insurgents for over 60 years has produced thousands of refugees and internally displaced people. According to official statistics, less than 10% of primary school students in Karen State reach high school. All the institutions of higher education are located in Hpa-An City.

Health care
The general state of health care in Myanmar is poor. Although health care is nominally free, in reality, patients have to pay for medicine and treatment, even in public clinics and hospitals. Public hospitals lack some basic facilities and equipment.

In general, the health care infrastructure outside of Yangon and Mandalay is poor but is especially worse in conflict ridden areas like Karen State. The public health care system in the state is very poor. The following is a summary of the public health care system in the state.

See also
Kawthoolei
Karen Human Rights Group
Democratic Karen Buddhist Army
Karen National Union
Karen National Liberation Army
Karen conflict (Armed conflict)

References

External links
 Burma's Longest War: Anatomy of the Karen Conflict 2011, Ashley South at the Transnational Institute
 "Planning Map Kayin State"  2008, Myanmar Information Management Unit (MIMU)

 
States of Myanmar
Karen people